Moro Nero (or Moró Neró) is a locality of Kallepia Village, Paphos District, Cyprus. An isolated point without access from the road network, "nestled" in the surrounding nature, a settlement that once was filled with life and today is accessible only by the Kallepia Episkopi Nature Trail, Moro Nero was a mixed village inhabited by both Greek Cypriots and Turkish Cypriots. At the village there is the ruined Byzantine church of Saint Gennadius of Constantinople and it is believed that he was buried there. The settlement is situated 213 metres above sea level. Moró Neró, is southeast of Agrioelia (locality of Tsada) and west of Chelidoni. Episkopi is 2 km south of Moró Neró.

References

 
 
Paphos District